Justin Case is a 1988 television film by Blake Edwards. George Carlin stars as a private investigator named Justin Case.

From an idea by Edwards' daughter, actress Jennifer Edwards, a pilot was made for a proposed TV series, however only the pilot was made and plans for a series were later abandoned. The TV movie was produced by the Blake Edwards Company in association with Walt Disney Television.

Plot
Justin is found dead in his office by Jennifer Spalding who is an out of work dancer there for an interview for a secretary/receptionist position. Justin comes back as a ghost that only Jennifer can see, and convinces her to help unravel the mystery of his murder.

Cast
 George Carlin as Justin Case
 Molly Hagan as Jennifer Spalding
 Timothy Stack as Officer Swan
 Kevin McClarnon as Officer Rush
 Douglas Sills as David Porter
 Gordon Jump as Sheldon Wannamaker
 Paul Sand as Cab Driver
 Valerie Wildman as Woman in Black
 Todd Susman as Aaron Slinker
 Rod McCary as Simon Fresca
 Philippe Denham as Paul Arkin
 Richard McGonagle as Dr. Richard Wwintraub
 Jay Thomas as Delivery Man
 Kenneth Tigar as Motel Manager
 Kay Perry as Lucille Marposian

External links

 
 

American television films
Films directed by Blake Edwards
1988 television films
1988 films
1980s English-language films
Films scored by Henry Mancini
Films with screenplays by Blake Edwards